Oleh Derevinsky (17 July 1966) is an association footballer from the former Soviet Union who played for FC Metalist Kharkiv. After retiring as a player, Derevinsky became a football referee.

References

External links
 Oleh Derevinsky at the footballfacts.ru
 Oleh Derevinsky at the allplayers.in.ua
 

1966 births
Living people
Footballers from Kyiv
Soviet footballers
Ukrainian footballers
Ukrainian football referees
FC Ros Bila Tserkva players
FC Metalist Kharkiv players
Wisła Kraków players
FC Temp Shepetivka players
FC Metalurh Zaporizhzhia players
FC Kryvbas Kryvyi Rih players
FC Zirka Kropyvnytskyi players
Soviet Top League players
Ukrainian Premier League players
Ukrainian First League players
Ukrainian expatriate footballers
Expatriate footballers in Poland
Ukrainian expatriate sportspeople in Poland
Association football defenders